Shorea praestans (called, along with some other species in the genus Shorea, light red meranti) is a species of plant in the family Dipterocarpaceae. It is a tree endemic to Borneo, where it is confined to Sarawak.

References

praestans
Endemic flora of Borneo
Trees of Borneo
Flora of Sarawak
Taxonomy articles created by Polbot